The 2800 Class is a type of Diesel Multiple Unit operated on the Irish railway network by Iarnród Éireann, used mainly for short-haul InterCity and Commuter services.

Description

The 2800 Class were built in Japan by Tokyu Car Corporation. Ten were built and entered into service in 2000. Like the 2600, 2700 and 2750 Classes, they were delivered in "Arrow" livery, however the Arrow logo was removed shortly after they entered service and replaced with the National Development Plan logo. The units were rebranded to Commuter livery from 2003. They were  the last of the IÉ railcar fleet to retain the IÉ orange livery, the last unit being repainted into Commuter livery in late 2005. Although rare, the units can operate attached to 2600 class units. The 2800 Class were the first Irish trains to be fitted with PA systems which included both on-board announcements and message boards at either end of the coach.  The 2800 Class underwent  rebranding using a new livery with the silver green Irish Rail livery for use on InterCity routes. Following refurbishment, the cab-end corridor connections were removed.

Deployment
The 2800 Class was bought for use on the Western Commuter (then Western Suburban) service, where they replaced the Cravens stock then used on the line in conjunction with the 2600 Class. This meant an end to the use of locomotive-hauled stock on the line. Although intended for this service, they were largely redeployed following the introduction of the 29000 Class which now mostly operates the line, along with the 22000 Class, which was introduced on the Western Commuter service in 2012. They now operate on a variety of lines. Because of their design, which allows movement between sets of multiple units working together, they were used on Rosslare line InterCity services where it was possible to run a minimal catering service on the line using these units. They were redeployed back onto Commuter services when the 22000 Class entered service on the Rosslare line. Since the 2800 Class were replaced with the 22000 Class on all Dublin Commuter services, the entire fleet was moved to Limerick. The 2800 Class now operate the following routes:
 Limerick-Ennis-Galway
 Limerick-Nenagh
 Limerick-Ballybrophy
 Limerick-Limerick Junction 
 Manulla Junction-Ballina
They also operate on the Cork Commuter on occasions where they substitute for a 2600 class, but this is not a regular event.
 Cork-Cobh
 Cork-Midleton
 Cork-Mallow

Fleet details

External links

 Irish Rail Fleet Information webpage 
 Japan Transport Engineering Company webpage

Iarnród Éireann multiple units
Tokyu Car multiple units